The discography of Savage Garden, an Australian duo made up of singer Darren Hayes and producer Daniel Jones, contains two studio albums, one compilation album, thirteen singles and four video albums. According to the duo's manager and reported by Billboard, the two studio albums released by the duo have sold 23 million copies worldwide.

Albums

Studio albums

Compilation albums

Singles

Promotional singles

Music videos

Video albums
 The Video Collection (1998)
 Includes five music videos: "I Want You", "To the Moon and Back", "Truly Madly Deeply", "Break Me Shake Me" and "Tears of Pearls".
 International Video Collection: The Story So Far (1999)
 Includes eight music videos: "I Want You", "To the Moon and Back", "Truly Madly Deeply", "Break Me Shake Me", "Universe", "Santa Monica", "Tears of Pearls" and "To the Moon and Back" (Dance Remix). Also includes video clips and interview footage.
 Superstars and Cannonballs: Live and on Tour in Australia (2001)
 Includes the "Parallel Lives" documentary, a ninety-minute concert from Brisbane, Australia, and three music videos: "I Knew I Loved You", "Crash and Burn" and "Affirmation". The DVD also includes commentary from the band and a discography section.
 Truly Madly Completely: The Videos (2005)
 Includes seven music videos: "I Want You", "To the Moon and Back", "Truly Madly Deeply", "Break Me Shake Me", "I Knew I Loved You", "Crash and Burn" and "Hold Me", plus the "Parallel Lives" documentary.

Notes

References

External links

 

Discographies of Australian artists
Pop music group discographies
Discography